Sallqaqucha wallata warak'ay (Quechua sallqa wild, qucha, lake, Sallqaqucha a lake of the Lares District, wallata Andean goose, warak'ay to hit with a sling or slingshot, which might be translated as "hitting the Andean goose of Sallqaqucha with a sling") is a typical dance of the Sacred Valley in the Cusco Region in Peru. It is mainly danced by the communities around the village and the lake named Sallqaqucha (Salcacocha, Salqa Qocha) in the Lares District of the Calca Province.

See also
 Ch'iqun
 Killaqucha
 Lares trek
 Peruvian dances
 Pumawank'a
 Qhapaq Saya
 Qiwñaqucha
 Siriwani

Sources 

Peruvian dances
Native American dances
Cusco Region